Michaela Mabinty DePrince (born Mabinty Bangura, 6 January 1995) is a Sierra Leonean-American ballet dancer, currently dancing with the Boston Ballet. She rose to fame after starring in the documentary First Position in 2011, following her and other young ballet dancers as they prepared to compete at the Youth America Grand Prix. With her adoptive mother, Elaine DePrince, she authored the book Taking Flight: From War Orphan to Star Ballerina. DePrince formerly danced with the Dance Theatre of Harlem as the youngest dancer in the history of the company and was a former soloist with the Dutch National Ballet. Since 2016, Michaela is a goodwill ambassador with the Dutch organisation War Child, based in Amsterdam.

Early life
Born as Mabinty Bangura into a Muslim family, she grew up as an orphan in Sierra Leone after her uncle brought her to an orphanage during the civil war. Her adoptive parents were told that her father was shot and killed by the Revolutionary United Front when she was three years old, and that her mother starved to death soon after. Frequently malnourished, mistreated, and derided as a "devil's child" because of vitiligo, a skin condition causing depigmentation, she fled to a refugee camp after her orphanage was bombed.

In 1999, at the age of four, she and another girl, also named Mabinty, later given the name Mia, were adopted by Elaine and Charles DePrince, a couple from Cherry Hill, New Jersey, and taken to the United States. The DePrince family has 11 children, including Michaela, nine of whom were adopted.

Career
Inspired by a magazine cover of a ballerina she found and kept while in Sierra Leone, DePrince trained as a ballet dancer in the U.S, performing at the Youth America Grand Prix among other competitions.  She trained in classical ballet at The Rock School for Dance Education in Philadelphia, Pennsylvania. Concurrent with intense ballet training, DePrince took online classes through Keystone National High School, where she earned her high school diploma.

DePrince was awarded a scholarship to study at the American Ballet Theatre's Jacqueline Kennedy Onassis School of Ballet for her performance at the Youth America Grand Prix. She pursued a professional career despite encountering instances of racial discrimination: aged eight, she was told that she couldn't perform as Marie in The Nutcracker sadly because "America's not ready for a black girl ballerina", and a year later, a teacher told her mother that black dancers weren't worth investing money in.

DePrince was one of the stars of the 2011 documentary film First Position, which follows six young dancers vying for a place in an elite ballet company or school, and performed on the TV show Dancing with the Stars. In 2011 she made her European debut in Abdallah and the Gazelle of Basra with De Dutch Don't Dance Division (Dance Company The Hague, NL), The Hague, Netherlands. She came back there a year later to dance The Sugar Plum Fairy in The Nutcracker at the Lucent Dance Theatre.

In 2012, she graduated from the American Ballet Theatre's Jacqueline Kennedy Onassis School in New York, and joined the Dance Theatre of Harlem, where she was the youngest member of the company. Her professional debut performance was in the role of Gulnare in Mzansi Productions and the South African Ballet Theatre's premiere of Le Corsaire on 19 July 2012.

In July 2013, she joined the junior company of the Dutch National Ballet, based in Amsterdam. In August 2014 she joined the Dutch National Ballet as an éleve (student). In 2015 she was promoted to the rank of Coryphée. In 2016 she was promoted to the rank of grand sujet, and then to soloist at the end of the same year. When she first joined the Dutch National Ballet she was the only dancer of African origin. In 2016, she performed in the "Hope" sequence of Beyoncé's Lemonade.

DePrince has cited Lauren Anderson, one of the first black American principal ballerinas, as her role model. In 2015 MGM acquired the film rights to DePrince's book Taking Flight: From War Orphan to Star Ballerina. In 2018 MGM announced that Madonna will direct Taking Flight, a biopic on DePrince's life and career.

In 2021, DePrince joined the Boston Ballet as second soloist.

Personal life 
While a dancer with Dance Theatre of Harlem, DePrince went on tour to Israel where she prayed at the Wailing Wall. She wore a hamsa for protection while traveling to the Dome of the Rock and the Dead Sea, a symbol that is significant to both Jews and Muslims.

As of 2015, she is in a relationship with the ballet dancer Skyler Maxey-Wert.

References

1995 births
Living people
21st-century American women writers
21st-century American ballet dancers
American adoptees
African-American ballet dancers
African-American female dancers
African-American women writers
American ballerinas
American expatriates in the Netherlands
Boston Ballet soloists
21st-century American memoirists
Articles containing video clips
Dance Theatre of Harlem dancers
Dutch National Ballet dancers
Jacqueline Kennedy Onassis School alumni
People from Cherry Hill, New Jersey
People with vitiligo
Sierra Leonean ballerinas
Sierra Leonean emigrants to the United States
Sierra Leonean expatriates in the Netherlands
Sierra Leonean refugees
Sierra Leonean women writers
American women memoirists
People from Kenema